Guy Loren Shaw (May 16, 1881 – May 19, 1950) was a U.S. Representative from Illinois.

Born on a farm near Summer Hill, Illinois, Shaw attended the public schools and the College of Agriculture of the University of Illinois. He engaged in agricultural pursuits and the development of overflow lands along the Illinois River. He served as delegate to the State constitutional convention in 1920.

Shaw was elected as a Republican to the Sixty-seventh Congress (March 4, 1921 – March 3, 1923). He was an unsuccessful candidate for reelection in 1922 to the Sixty-eighth Congress. He engaged in the real estate business in Beardstown, Illinois, and Urbana, Champaign County, Illinois. He moved to Normal, McLean County, Illinois, and continued agricultural pursuits, farm management, and the real estate business. He died in Normal, Illinois, May 19, 1950. He was interred in Bloomington Cemetery, Bloomington, Illinois.

References

1881 births
1950 deaths
Republican Party members of the United States House of Representatives from Illinois
20th-century American politicians
People from Beardstown, Illinois
People from Pike County, Illinois
University of Illinois College of Agriculture, Consumer, and Environmental Sciences alumni
Businesspeople from Illinois
Farmers from Illinois
20th-century American businesspeople